The list of ship decommissionings in 1950 includes a chronological list of all ships decommissioned in 1950.


See also 

1950
Ship decommissionings
 List of ship decommissionings in 1950